, previously called  until 2005, was a small airport in Kokura Minami-ku, Kitakyūshū, Japan. There used to be four flights to and from Tokyo Haneda every day. It is now commonly referred to as Kokura, its location, to distinguish it from the New Kitakyushu Airport (renamed Kitakyushu Airport in 2008), an offshore airport built on a man-made island in Suo nada, the most westerly part of the Seto Inland Sea. The new airport opened in March 2006, taking over the old airport codes . The final scheduled flight from the airport was an MD-87 to Haneda Airport with the final flight was the CRJ-200 to Komaki Airport left before midnight of 16 March 2006.

As of 2013, the former airport is one of the potential sites for new JASDF facilities as part of an ongoing defense buildup.

Airports in Japan
Transport in Fukuoka Prefecture
Defunct airports in Japan
Buildings and structures in Fukuoka Prefecture
Airports established in 1944
Airports disestablished in 2006
1944 establishments in Japan
2006 disestablishments in Japan